The Brosno Dragon, also known as Brosnya (Russian: Бросня), is a lake monster which in Russian folklore is said to inhabit Lake Brosno near Andreapol in western Russia. It is described as resembling a dragon and is the subject of a number of regional legends, some which are said to date back to the 13th century.

Theories
Many people treat the existence of Brosnya skeptically and say that the creature may be a beaver or a giant pike.

History
It was rumored in the 18th and 19th centuries that the giant creature emerged on the lake surface in the evening, but immediately submerged when people approached. It is said that during World War II the beast swallowed up a German airplane.

See also 
 Loch Ness Monster
 Monster of Lake Tota
 Limnic eruption

References

Dragons
Legendary serpents
Culture of Tver Oblast
Slavic legendary creatures
Water monsters